The Grenville steam carriage was developed in 1875 by Robert Neville-Grenville, assisted by George Jackson Churchward. It was built around a boiler from a Merryweather & Sons fire engine, and could carry seven people including the driver, steersman and stoker.

The carriage is preserved at the National Motor Museum, Beaulieu, and is thought to be the oldest self-propelled passenger-carrying vehicle still in working order.

Design 
Neville-Grenville, the eldest son of Ralph Neville-Grenville, of Butleigh Court, Butleigh, Glastonbury, is said to have received the first engineering degree from Cambridge University. He gathered several steam tractors, ploughs and other engines to work on the family estate. He and Churchward met as apprentices at the South Devon Railway's works at Newton Abbot.

From 1874, in a collaboration that lasted fifteen years, they designed and built a steam-powered, passenger carrying road vehicle. Built on a  steel girder, it had a single steering wheel turned by a tiller at the front, and two wheels on the driven axle at the rear. The three wheels were each built up from 16 teak segments held together by an iron tyre, a design known as a Mansell wheel. Two parallel seats carry six passengers, including the driver, though the brakes may be operated by a separate brakesman on the driver's right. A fireman sits at the rear, stoking the fire and maintaining the water level in the boiler. The boiler itself was taken from a Merryweather fire engine, and supplies the twin cylinders (which replaced the original single-cylinder design).

Operation 

Once steam is raised, the driver steers and controls the reverse/cut-off lever from the front seat. Brakes are applied through a foot pedal. For steeper roads, a dog clutch can engage an epicyclic reduction gear with a 2:1 ratio. The fireman can top-up the boiler using a feed pump driven by an intermediate shaft, or an injector when the vehicle is stationary.

Use and preservation 

The carriage was used around the Glastonbury area for about twenty years, until in 1898 it was converted to a stationary engine to power a cider-press. In the late 1930s it was restored to working order by John Allen & Sons. An account of this restoration is given by George Allen.

In 1946 it was chosen to lead the Society of Motor Manufacturers and Traders' London Cavalcade in celebration of the British Motor Industry's fifty-year Jubilee. It was driven by Captain Allen, while its stoker "[could not] read or write...; he had never before been out of his native Sussex."

It was gifted to Bristol City Museum in 1947 by Captain Philip L. Neville, the builder's nephew, where, after years on static display, it was again restored to working order. Paul Elkin the driver, and his stoker Fred Lester, managed to get the vehicle to pass the MOT test, so that it could take part in the 1977 Bristol Lord Mayor’s Jubilee Procession. After this, however, the 1938 replacement boiler from Shand Mason & Co was found to be under the original specification, so it was taken off the road and Jefferies of Avonmouth tasked with repairing it.

It was running again in 2000, in which year it was the oldest entrant to the London to Brighton Veteran Car Run, completing it in about nine hours. In 2009 it was loaned to the National Motor Museum, Beaulieu, where it is thought to be the oldest self-propelled passenger vehicle that remains in working order.

See also 
 Steam car
 List of steam car makers
 History of steam road vehicles

Notes and references

Notes

References

Sources

External links 

 Video: Grenville carriage in steam at Beaulieu
 Video: Grenville steam carriage visits the SS Great Britain
 Video: Newsreel of Grenville steam carriage at the 1947 SMMT parade (starting at 1:45)

Steam cars
1870s cars